The European Soundmix Show 1997 was the second European Soundmix Show.

Like the first contest, this one was held in Amsterdam, and the host country the Netherlands won the show with Edsilia Rombley imitating Oleta Adams.

Results

European Soundmix Show
1997 in music
1997 in the Netherlands